Polish Ocean Lines (PLO) is a Polish commercial shipping company, with headquarters in Gdynia. The company was created in 1951 in a merger of three smaller shipping companies. Currently, PLO acts as a holding company for 12 other shipping companies.

History

PLO was founded as a state owned company in 1951, with the merger of: Gdynia-Ameryka Linie Żeglugowe S.A. (Gdynia-America Line – GAL), Żegluga Polska (Shipping Polish) and Polsko-Brytyjskie Towarzystwo Okrętowe (Polish-British Shipping Partnership). After the creation of the company there was gradual development including buying more equipment and increased employment. From 1951 to 1954, the company was also a part owner the Sopot Grand Hotel.

In 1967, due to the blockade of the Suez Canal, PLO ships, performing cruises to the Far East, were forced to circumnavigate Africa.

In 1969, the company's flagship ceased to be , which was scrapped in 1971 with its place taken by the more modern .

About 10,000 people were employed, of which nearly 80% were crew at sea. Freight reached 5 million tons. During that time ships engaged in freight shipping were moved to another state owned company, PŻM. This made it possible to consolidate the shipping sector in Poland. The transport of shipping containers was also started at this time.

The introduction of martial law in Poland in 1981 reduced turnover, which began to cause losses. The process restricted operations. Older ships were scrapped and some newer ones sold. By the end of the 80s the fleet had shrunk to 97 ships.

Systemic changes in Poland following the fall of communism in 1989 necessitated profound changes in the PLO, which had to be restructured. Savings were identified, activity reduced, and employment cut. On 29 June 1999 the state company was transformed into a joint stock company. By this stage, companies within the group employed only about three thousand people. Currently, there are attempts to increase PLO's participation in global maritime transport.

Activities
Currently the PLO group has 12 subsidiary companies, two of which are in liquidation. The most important is the company POL-Levant (POL-Levant Linie Żeglugowe Spółka z o.o.), whose main task is to provide profile strict shipping. It deals with, among others, maintaining the scheduled tonnage for conventional and RORO vessels in the Baltic, the North Sea and the Mediterranean.

Other PLO companies duties include the organization of supply vessels and the recruitment of crews.

Notable ships

Sources

1951 establishments in Poland
Shipping companies of Poland
Polish brands